Thomas Agyepong (born 10 October 1996) is a Ghanaian professional footballer who plays as a winger, most recently for Manchester City. He has previously played on loan for Dutch clubs Twente and NAC Breda, Scottish club Hibernian and Belgian clubs Waasland-Beveren and Lommel. He has also made six full international appearances for Ghana national team.

Club career

Manchester City
Agyepong joined Manchester City in 2015 from the Right to Dream Academy.

Loan to FC Twente
Agyepong was loaned to Dutch Eredivisie team FC Twente for the 2015–16 Eredivisie season. He made his debut on 4 October, appearing as a substitute in a 3–1 loss to AZ Alkmaar. His first start came on 24 October in a 3–1 loss to PSV Eindhoven playing 62 minutes. A shoulder injury suffered in March required surgery, which ended his season.

Loan to NAC Breda
On 10 July 2016, Agyepong signed on loan with Dutch second division team NAC Breda for the 2016–17 season. He made his debut on 12 August, playing 61 minutes in a 2–1 win over Achilles '29. On 2 December, he scored his first goal for the club, in the 92 minute of a 3–1 win over Almere City.

Loan to Hibernian
In August 2018, Agyepong joined Scottish Premiership club Hibernian on loan until the end of the 2018–19 season, pending approval of a work permit application. Agyepong missed much of the 2018–19 season due to knee and thigh injuries.

Loan to Waasland-Beveren
In August 2019, Agyepong was loaned to Belgian First Division A club Waasland-Beveren until the end of the 2019–20 season.

Loan to Lommel S.K.
In October 2020, Agyepong and teammate Aminu Mohammed joined Belgian First Division B side Lommel on loan until the end of the 2020–21 season. Like his parent club, Lommel are owned by City Football Group.

International career
Agyepong made his debut for the Ghana national football team in a 5–0 2019 Africa Cup of Nations qualification win over Ethiopia on 11 June 2017. He made four further appearances for Ghana during 2017, including two 2018 World Cup qualifiers against Congo. Despite his injury problems during the 2018–19 season, Agyepong was included in the provisional squad for the 2019 Africa Cup of Nations. He made the final squad and was selected for the first match, but suffered an injury after 36 minutes and did not play again in the tournament.

Career statistics

Club

International

References

External links

Living people
1995 births
Association football forwards
Ghanaian footballers
Ghana international footballers
Manchester City F.C. players
FC Twente players
NAC Breda players
Eredivisie players
Eerste Divisie players
Ghanaian expatriate footballers
Expatriate footballers in England
Expatriate footballers in the Netherlands
Ghanaian expatriate sportspeople in England
Ghanaian expatriate sportspeople in the Netherlands
Hibernian F.C. players
Expatriate footballers in Scotland
Scottish Professional Football League players
2019 Africa Cup of Nations players
S.K. Beveren players
Ghanaian expatriate sportspeople in Belgium
Expatriate footballers in Belgium
Belgian Pro League players
Ghana under-20 international footballers
Ghanaian expatriate sportspeople in Scotland